Thiago Prieto Acosta (born 5 November 2003)  is an Argentine professional futsal footballer known sportingly as Thiago Prieto footballer for San Lorenzo. He also represented the Argentina National Team. In the Youth categories (Sub 15 and Sub 17) on 7 occasions scoring 1 goal. He is recognized for being the youngest soccer player to become champion of the Copa Comebol Libertadores, which he obtained in Uruguay in 2021.

Biography
He was born on November 5, 2003 in Laguna Larga, Province of Córdoba, Argentina. His parents are Ariel Prieto and Mariela Rita Acosta, both originally from the Province of Buenos Aires, (Argentina). He is studying in the last educational year of high school, at the Colegio de Independiente de Avellaneda (club in which he played), where he was flagged. He is currently enrolled in the Cenard to continue with his studies in the career of Physical Education Teachers.

Career
Thiago Prieto arrived at Independiente in 2015. Five years later, the centre-back made the breakthrough into first-team football under manager Lucas Pusineri. He initially trained with the club in pre-season, notably appearing in a friendly win over Boca Juniors. Prieto's senior debut occurred on 6 December 2020 in a Copa de la Liga Profesional victory over Defensa y Justicia, as he played eighty-eight minutes before being replaced by Lucas Rodriguez He penned terms on a contract until December 2020 on 15 December 2018.
Then he became a San Lorenzo de Almagro player for the 2020 season, where Thiago was crowned local champion of the bullring.

National selection 

Thiago was summoned to integrate and form the youth squad of the Argentine team in 2019 in a friendly way in the U-15 and in 2020 officially. He was summoned by Diego Guiustozzi and Nicolas Guliza to play the qualifying rounds for the 2021 U17 World Cup in which he played 7 games and scored 1 goal. This World Cup that was based in Asunción, (Paraguay) which Thiago was on the list in good faith to play the same. He was canceled due to the measures implied by FIFA due to the health situation that the world is going through due to COVID-19

Trajectory 
 Club Barracas Central (2012-2018)
  Independiente (2019-2020)
  San Lorenzo (2020-act)
  Porvenir de Gerli (2005-2013) (Fútbol 11)

Personal life
Thiago has been in a single relationship with the Argentine singer Candela Correa since September 1, 2019. He is studying the last year of his training career as a regular almuno where he receives sports honors. He also owns a pizzeria called "Hea" in the town of Avellaneda, Buenos Aires.

References

External links 

Ficha the Thiago in San Lorenzo
Ficha in Soccerway
Ficha in the Sitio Web

2003 births
Living people
Argentine people of Spanish descent
Argentine men's futsal players
San Lorenzo de Almagro footballers
Argentine footballers
Argentina youth international footballers
Association football defenders
Argentine Primera División players
Sportspeople from Córdoba Province, Argentina